One Magic Christmas is a 1985 Christmas fantasy film directed by Phillip Borsos. It was released by Walt Disney Pictures and stars Mary Steenburgen and Harry Dean Stanton. It was shot in Meaford, Ontario with some scenes in Owen Sound, Ontario, Canada.

Plot
Santa Claus assigns the Christmas angel Gideon (Harry Dean Stanton) to restore the Christmas spirit of Ginnie Grainger (Mary Steenburgen), the mother of Cal (Robbie Magwood) and Abbie (Elisabeth Harnois). Her husband Jack (Gary Basaraba) has been out of work for six months, and they must vacate their company-owned house by the new year. Jack fixes bikes as a hobby and dreams of opening his own bike shop, which would use up all the family savings. Ginnie works as a grocery store cashier.

Two nights before Christmas Eve, Abbie meets Gideon while mailing a letter to Santa. Gideon asks her to have her mother mail it instead and protects Abbie from being hit by a speeding car. Abbie gives the letter to her mother, but she refuses to mail it.

The family visits Jack's grandfather Caleb (Arthur Hill), who gives Abbie a snow globe of the North Pole. Gideon visits Abbie again and warns her that some bad things are going to happen, but she should not be afraid. He "accidentally" drops and shatters her snow globe, then magically restores it. Ginnie and Jack discuss their finances where Ginnie tells Jack he should find a new job instead of opening the bike shop. Frustrated, he leaves the house to go for a walk. She goes after him and meets Gideon. All the Christmas lights on the street around her turn off.

On Christmas Eve, on her way to work, Ginnie meets Harry Dickens at a gas station who is trying to sell some of his possessions in order to support himself and his son. She goes on her way while Jack leaves the children in the car while he goes to the bank to withdraw some of their savings for Christmas shopping. Abbie leaves the car to see Ginnie at the grocery store across the street and tells her that Jack is at the bank. She leaves to stop him and her boss fires her. She returns Abbie to the car and enters the bank, which Harry is robbing at gunpoint. Jack attempts to calm Harry down, but he impulsively shoots and kills Jack. He flees in Jack's car with Cal and Abbie still inside. Ginnie takes his car to chase after him, but runs out of gas before she can catch up to him. He swerves to avoid the police, but skids off a bridge into the river. Believing she has lost her husband and children, Ginnie returns to the house grief-stricken. Gideon rescues the children and the police bring them home. Ginnie tells them that their father is dead and is never coming home.

Abbie goes to the town's Christmas tree to find Gideon and asks him to bring back her father. He tells her he can't and the only one who can is Santa Claus. Gideon takes Abbie to the North Pole to see Santa, who informs her that he also cannot fix what has happened or make her mother feel better, but perhaps Abbie can. He shows her his workshop, which is a factory run by Christmas angels (dead people like Gideon) instead of elves. He retrieves a letter Ginnie sent him as a child and tells Abbie to give it to her mother.

Gideon returns Abbie to her house and she gives her mother the letter. Reading it makes her realize that the spirit of Christmas is to be thankful for what she has. She goes outside to mail Abbie's letter and says goodbye to Gideon. All the Christmas lights on the street come back on and it is the night before Christmas Eve again. Jack is alive.

The next day, Ginnie's boss gives her the day off so she can spend it with her family. At the gas station, she buys Harry's camp stove. He does not rob the bank. That evening, she attends the tree lighting in the village square and joins the participants in singing O Christmas Tree. Later, the family is celebrating Christmas at Caleb's and she writes a check to Jack for the bike shop as a Christmas present. Ginnie hears Santa downstairs and finds him putting presents under the tree. He tells her "Merry Christmas, Ginnie" and she says it in return.

Cast

Production
The idea for the picture originated in 1976 when director Phillip Borsos wrote a one-page story idea. He later co-wrote a first draft with Barry Healey, but the script was reportedly turned down by every Hollywood studio, although his efforts secured the commitments of actress Mary Steenburgen, and producer Fred Roos. The film was initially announced under the title of Father Christmas with Richard Farnsworth slated to star in the role of Gideon reteaming him with Borsos after the two had previously collaborated on 1982's The Grey Fox. Although the film was slated to begin shooting in December of 1983, the film was delayed due to financing problems resulting in the film's budget being scaled back from $9 million to $7.5 million. In February 1985, it was announced Walt Disney Pictures had come on board as a producer following Orion Pictures dropping out, and Disney would supply two-thirds of the budget (approximately $5.5 million) while Telefilm Canada’s Broadcast Fund would supply the remaining one-third. The following March it was announced that Harry Dean Stanton would be assuming the role of Gideon originally intended for Farnsworth.  300 locals served as background actors for a shopping mall scene, filmed in Feb 1985, and fifty shopkeepers agreed to replace their Valentine’s Day decorations with Christmas decorations for the scene. Additionally, residents on a street in the Toronto suburb of Scarborough decorated their homes with Christmas lights for the production. Snow had to be brought in by trucks, following an unseasonable thaw. Reportedly, five tons of snow were brought in from surrounding areas in more than 100 dump truck loads over a four-day period. Ironically, a blizzard blew in days later, and crew members had to remove the excess snow. Sleet, rain, fog, mud, and wind gusts up to fifty miles per hour made filming a challenge. The Toronto post office supplied 20,000 actual letters to Santa Claus for the scene at Santa’s workshop. Prior to release, the film's title was changed to One Night Before Christmas before producers settle on One Magic Christmas for the final re-title.

Release
The film was theatrically released in Canada and the United States on November 22, 1985. It opened in Brazil on December 18, 1985, in the UK the following year, on September 24, 1986, and in Australia on November 27, 1986. It was released in Uruguay on December 12, 1986, through VHS (Montevideo), and in Japan the following year, on November 25, 1987, on VHS.

The film was released in many languages with several alternate titles.  
Bulgaria (Bulgarian title)....Една вълшебна Коледа (A Magical Christmas)
Brazil....O Natal Mágico (The Magical Christmas)
Canada (working title) (English title)....Father Christmas
Canada (French title)....Un Drôle De Noël (Funny Christmas)
Spain (TV title)....Navidad Mágica (Magic Christmas)
France....Un drôle de Noël (Funny Christmas)
Spain....Navidades Mágicas (Magical Christmas)
Finland....Joulukuun Kaksi Päivää (Two Days Of December)
United Kingdom (video box title)....Disney's One Magic Christmas
Greece (DVD title)....Kapoia Magika Hristougenna (Some Magical Christmas)
Greece (TV title)....Magika Hristougenna (Magical Christmas)
Hungary....Varázslatos karácsony (Magical Christmas)
Italy....Un Magico Natale (A Magical Christmas)
Peru....Una Navidad Mágica (A Magical Christmas)
Poland....Czarodziejskie Boze Narodzenie
Portugal....Natal Mágico (Magical Christmas)
Sweden....En Förtrollad Jul (An Enchanted Christmas)
Soviet Union (Russian title)....Волшебное Рождество (Magic Christmas)
West Germany....Wenn Träume Wahr Wären (If Dreams Were True)

It was released on DVD in the United States (Region 1) on August 21, 2001.

On December 4, 2012, Netflix released the DVD and later made it available to stream in the United States, France, and the Netherlands.

Box office
One Magic Christmas grossed $2,662,241 in its opening weekend in North America, November 22–24, 1985, and a domestic total of $13,677,222.

Critical response
One Magic Christmas has a 47% score on Rotten Tomatoes from 17 critics. Roger Ebert gave the film two stars out of four, saying, "This is very unfortunate. What we have here is a movie with an intelligent screenplay, wonderful performances and skillful direction, but it is a tactical miscalculation from beginning to end."

Janet Maslin of The New York Times called the film "modern[,] with a gratifyingly old-fashioned feeling, some of which is a matter of its unself-conscious plainness".

See also
 List of films about angels
 List of Christmas films
 Santa Claus in film

References

External links

American fantasy films
Canadian fantasy films
English-language Canadian films
1985 fantasy films
American Christmas films
Canadian Christmas films
Santa Claus in film
Films directed by Phillip Borsos
Films with screenplays by Thomas Meehan (writer)
Walt Disney Pictures films
Films shot in Ontario
1980s Christmas films
1980s English-language films
1980s American films
1980s Canadian films
Films about mother–daughter relationships